Mariya Sizyakova (born 3 September 1935) is a Soviet athlete. She competed in the women's pentathlon at the 1964 Summer Olympics.

References

External links 
 

1935 births
Living people
Athletes (track and field) at the 1964 Summer Olympics
Soviet pentathletes
Olympic athletes of the Soviet Union
Sportspeople from Nizhny Novgorod